Nurse Education in Practice is a peer-reviewed nursing journal covering nursing, midwifery, and healthcare education published by Elsevier. It was established in 2001 and its founding editor was Karen Holland. The current editor-in-chief is Roger Watson (Southwest Medical University).

Abstracting and indexing
The journal is abstracted and indexed in:
Scopus
MEDLINE/PubMed
Current Contents/Life Sciences
CINAHL
According to the Journal Citation Reports, the journal has a 2021 impact factor of 3.43.

References

External links

Nursing education
General nursing journals
Elsevier academic journals
Publications established in 2001
English-language journals
8 times per year journals